AFNLP (Asian Federation of Natural Language Processing Associations) is the organization for coordinating the natural language processing related activities and events in the Asia-Pacific region.

Foundation
AFNLP was founded on 4 October 2000.

Member Associations
 ALTA – Australasian Language Technology Association
 ANLP Japan Association of Natural Language Processing
 ROCLING Taiwan ROC Computational Linguistics Society
 SIG-KLC Korea SIG-Korean Language Computing of Korea Information Science Society

Existing Asian Initiatives
NLPRS: Natural Language Processing Pacific Rim Symposium
IRAL: International Workshop on Information Retrieval with Asian Languages
PACLING: Pacific Association for Computational Linguistics
PACLIC: Pacific Asia Conference on Language, Information and Computation
PRICAI: Pacific Rim International Conference on AI
ICCPOL: International Conference on Computer Processing of Oriental Languages
ROCLING: Research on Computational Linguistics Conference

Conferences
IJCNLP-04: The 1st International Joint Conference on Natural Language Processing in Hainan Island, China
IJCNLP-05: The 2nd International Joint Conference on Natural Language Processing in Jeju Island, Korea
IJCNLP-08: The 3rd International Joint Conference on Natural Language Processing in Hyderabad, India
ACL-IJCNLP-2009: Joint Conference of the 47th Annual Meeting of the Association for Computational Linguistics (ACL) and 4th International Joint Conference on Natural Language Processing (IJCNLP) in Singapore
IJNCLP-11: The 5th International Joint Conference on Natural Language Processing in Chiang Mai, Thailand

References

External links
http://www.afnlp.org/

Natural language processing